Lady Cheongjunamwon of the Cheongju Gim clan was the younger daughter of Gim Geung-ryul who became the third wife of King Jeongjong of Goryeo while her elder sister became Hyejong of Goryeo's 3rd wife, Lady Cheongju.

In popular culture
Portrayed by Do Ji-young in the 2002–2003 KBS TV series The Dawn of the Empire.

References

Royal consorts of the Goryeo Dynasty
10th-century Korean people
Year of birth unknown
Year of death unknown